Peter George Hatch (born 3 July 1938) is an English former first-class cricketer and British Army officer.

Hatch was born at Kirkee, in what was then British India. He was educated in England at Malvern College, before attending the Royal Military Academy Sandhurst. He graduated from the Royal Military Academy in December 1958, entering into the Royal Engineers as a second lieutenant. He was promoted to the rank of lieutenant in December 1960. Hatch debuted in first-class cricket for the Combined Services cricket team against Surrey at The Oval in 1960, a season in which he also played against the touring South Africans at Portsmouth. 

He attended Queens College at the University of Cambridge during his military service, graduating with a B.A. in 1963. While at Cambridge, he played two first-class matches for the Free Foresters in 1961. He was the secretary to the college cricket club in 1961–62, a position he relinquished upon his impending marriage. In that same season, he played his final first-class match for the Combined Services against Northamptonshire. Across five first-class matches, Hatch scored 60 runs with a high score of 15. Shortly after obtaining his B.A., he was promoted to the rank of captain in December 1964. He gained his masters from Cambridge in 1967. He retired from active military service in June 1968, having received a gratuity.

References

External links

1938 births
Living people
People from Pune
People educated at Malvern College
Graduates of the Royal Military Academy Sandhurst
Royal Engineers officers
Alumni of Queens' College, Cambridge
English cricketers
Combined Services cricketers
Free Foresters cricketers